Blind Landing is a documentary podcast about professional sports hosted by Ari Saperstein. Season one focused on safety in gymnastics, while season two looks at identity in figure skating. The show was an honoree in the 2022 Webby Awards.

Background
The first season of Blind Landing released in July 2021, focused on artistic gymnastics and the vault controversy during the women's all-around final at the 2000 Summer Olympics, when the apparatus was set two inches too low, resulting in gymnasts falling and getting injured during the event. The first season featured interviews with Olympic gymnasts who were at the competition. All five episodes of the first season were released on July 19, 2021. The second season of Blind Landing, released in February 2022, is about figure skating and LGBTQ+ athletes.

Episodes

Introductory episodes

Season 1

Season 2

Reception 
Nicholas Quah of Vulture commented on the show saying that the podcast is "fairly rough around the edges." Wendy J. Fox praised the show in Podcast Review—a Los Angeles Review of Books publication—saying that it is a "thoughtful exploration of a decades-old scandal."

Awards

See also 

 List of sports podcasts
 Sports radio
 Sports journalism

References

External links
 

Audio podcasts
2021 podcast debuts
American podcasts
Sports podcasts
Documentary podcasts